WSSG (1300 AM) is a radio station licensed to Goldsboro, North Carolina. The station is currently owned by Donald Curtis' Eastern Airwaves, LLC.

Before its Jack FM format, WSSG was simulcasting country-formatted WZKT.

On August 7, 2017, WSSG changed their format from adult hits (as "Jack FM") to urban contemporary, branded as "92.7 Jamz".

Translators
WSSG operates an FM translator at 92.7 FM.

Previous logo

References

External links

SSG
Urban contemporary radio stations in the United States